Nikos Lekatsas (1926 – unknown) was a Greek footballer who played for Ethnikos Piraeus. He featured three times for the Greece national football team between 1949 and 1951, scoring four goals.

Career statistics

International

International goals
Scores and results list Greece's goal tally first, score column indicates score after each Greece goal.

References

1926 births
Date of death unknown
Footballers from Piraeus
Greek footballers
Greece international footballers
Association football forwards
Ethnikos Piraeus F.C. players